Hope Exchange railway station was located to the west of Penyffordd, Flintshire. The station was in fields with no road access, being an interchange between two lines. The high level section of the station opened on 18 November 1867 on the Wrexham, Mold and Connah's Quay Railway, and the low level section opened on the same day, on the London and North Western Railway. The high level platforms served what is now the Borderlands Line, and the low level platforms served the Mold Railway.  The railway line to Hope Low Level was completely removed by 1982. The railway through Hope High Level remains in use as the Borderlands Line. The platforms on the Borderlands Line are still extant whereas the Mold Line ones have been demolished.

References

Further reading

Disused railway stations in Flintshire
Railway stations in Great Britain opened in 1867
Railway stations in Great Britain closed in 1958
Former Great Central Railway stations
Former London and North Western Railway stations